Lindsay Davenport and Mary Joe Fernández defeated the defending champions Jana Novotná and Arantxa Sánchez Vicario in the final, 6–3, 6–2 to win the doubles tennis title at the 1996 WTA Tour Championships.

Seeds
Champion seeds are indicated in bold text while text in italics indicates the round in which those seeds were eliminated.

  Jana Novotná /  Arantxa Sánchez Vicario (final)
  Gigi Fernández /  Natasha Zvereva (semifinals)
  Lindsay Davenport /  Mary Joe Fernández (champions)
  Meredith McGrath /  Larisa Neiland (semifinals)

Draw

External links
 1996 Chase Championships Doubles Draw

WTA Tour Championships
1996 WTA Tour